The shoal sprite (Amphigyra alabamensis) was a species of minute, air-breathing, freshwater snail, an aquatic pulmonate gastropod mollusk in the family Planorbidae, the ram's horn snails. This species was endemic to Alabama, but it is now extinct.

Original description 
Species Amphigyra alabamensis was originally described by Henry Augustus Pilsbry in 1906.

Type locality is Coosa River near or in Wetumpka, Alabama.

Pilsbry's original text (the type description) reads as follows:

References 

Planorbidae
Extinct gastropods
Gastropods described in 1906
Taxonomy articles created by Polbot